Joseph Theodoor "Joep" Leerssen (born 12 June 1955, Leiden)  is a Dutch comparatist and cultural historian. He is professor of European studies at the University of Amsterdam, where he also holds a Royal Netherlands Academy Research Professorship. He was awarded the Spinozapremie in 2008.

Leerssen studied Comparative literature in Aachen (M.A. 1979) and Anglo-Irish Studies at University College Dublin (M.A. 1980), and received his doctorate from Utrecht University in 1986. He was appointed lecturer in European Studies in Amsterdam in 1986 and was given a professorial chair in the same subject in 1991. In addition, he has held guest professorships and visiting fellowships in Harvard (Erasmus Chair), Cambridge (Magdalene College) and Göttingen. He headed the Huizinga Institute, the Dutch National Research Institute for Cultural History, from 1996 until 2005.

Leerssen has worked in the fields of Irish Studies, imagology and European studies. His main research focus is on the relationship between national (self-)stereotyping and nationalism, and on the historical development of cultural and romantic nationalism in nineteenth-century Europe, using literary texts as a source for the history of ideas. His books Mere Irish & Fíor-Ghael (1986, repr. 1996) and Remembrance and Imagination (1996) deal with the pre-1800 and 19th-century emergence of an Irish national identity; Imagology (co-edited with Manfred Beller, 2007) is a handbook on the literary articulation of stereotypes of national characters; National Thought in Europe a survey of the culture-historical growth of nationalism in Europe.
In the field of nationalism studies, Leerssen takes up an intermediary position between the approaches of ethnosymbolism and modernism, stressing "the long memory and the short history" of nationalism. While emphasizing the agency of culture in the rise and spread of nationalism, he considers this culture to consist of a set of literary myths and stereotypes which only in modern times, under the influence of Romantic historicism, came to be mistaken for long-standing ethnic continuities.
Additionally, national identities always take shape by opposing the nation to a (historically changeable) variety of stereotyped foreigners; Leerssen defines nationalism as the "political instrumentalization" of such self/other-stereotypes. Since nationalism always involves an oppositional dynamics between different societies, and can therefore never be adequately comprehended on a single-country basis, Leerssen pleads for a rigorously transnational, comparative approach.
Within The Netherlands, Leerssen was involved in the official recognition of Limburgish as a regional language; he has written literary work in Limburgish.

In 2008 Leerssen was elected member of the Royal Netherlands Academy of Arts and Sciences. He holds an honorary doctorate from the University of Bucharest (2014).

Leerssen is married to the Irish cultural historian Ann Rigney; they have two children.

Selected publications 
 (1984) Komparatistik in Grossbritannien
 (1986) Mere Irish and Fíor-Ghael
 (1995) Historische verkenning van Mheer (with Wim Senden)
 (1996) Remembrance and Imagination
 (2006) National Thought in Europe
 (2006) De bronnen van het vaderland
 (2007) Imagology (edited, with Manfred Beller)
 (2008) Editing the Nation's Memory (edited, with Dirk Van Hulle)
 (2009) The Rhetoric of National Character (special issue, edited with Ton Hoenselaars, of the European Journal of English Studies)
 (2011) Spiegelpaleis Europa
 (2014) Commemorating Writers in Nineteenth-Century Europe (edited, with Ann Rigney)
 (2015) Nationalisme
 (2018) Encyclopedia of Romantic Nationalism in Europe (editor)
 (2018) The Rhine (edited, with Manfred Beller)
 (2019) Comparative Literature in Britain

Notes

External links 
 Amsterdam University staff homepage
 Personal homepage
 Imagology website
 Comparative nationalism research website

1955 births
Living people
20th-century Dutch historians
Dutch literary historians
Members of the Royal Netherlands Academy of Arts and Sciences
People from Leiden
Spinoza Prize winners
Academic staff of the University of Amsterdam
21st-century Dutch historians